The  PL-11 Airtruck is a New Zealand agricultural aircraft.

A strikingly unusual aircraft, the PL-11 Airtruck was developed from the Kingsford Smith PL.7 as a replacement for the de Havilland Tiger Moth in the New Zealand aerial topdressing market by Luigi Pellarini for Waitomo Aircraft. The prototype was constructed using bits of war surplus ex-RNZAF North American Harvards. It featured all aluminium structure, a high-wing monoplane with a steel stub wing and V lift struts, steerable tricycle undercarriage, an extremely stubby pod fuselage, the cockpit (made from shortened Harvard glazing) being mounted directly over the radial engine, providing excellent forward view and very high drag, beneath it was room for a superphosphate hopper or up to 5 people in a cabin. The strangeness was completed by twin booms each supporting unconnected tail units, (the idea being a truck could reverse between the tail units to load the hopper). Despite the outlandish appearance the Airtruck was surprisingly successful, if unable to compete with the Fletcher Fu24 in its design market.

The first Bennett Airtruck, ZK-BPV, took to the air on 2 August 1960, and crashed during trials in October 1963. Following company reorganization the second example, known as the Waitomo PL-11 Airtruck and registered ZK-CKE, flew in March 1965. It commenced commercial operations late in February 1967 but crashed a few days later. An unconfirmed report indicates that a third airframe was largely constructed but never flew.

A shortage of Harvard parts led to the type being redesigned for all-new construction by the Transavia Corporation, as the Transavia PL-12 Airtruk, 118 of which were produced in Australia between 1965 and 1985.

Specifications (Waitomo Airtruck)

References

 Taylor, John W. R. Jane's All The World's Aircraft 1965-66. London:Sampson Low, Marston & Company, 1965.

External links

Airliners.net info page
New Zealand forum discussion

1960s New Zealand agricultural aircraft
Aircraft manufactured in New Zealand
High-wing aircraft
Twin-boom aircraft
Single-engined tractor aircraft
Aircraft first flown in 1960